Tarryn Lombard (née Glasby; born 23 January 1995) is a South African field hockey player for the South African national team.

International career

Under-21
She participated at the 2013, 2016 Women's Hockey Junior World Cup. and 2016 Junior Africa cup for Nations.

National team
She participated at the 2018 and 2022 Women's Hockey World Cup.

Personal life
She attended El Shaddai Christian School, in Durbanville and are is graduated from Stellenbosch University is Bachelor of Commerce is 2017.

References

External links

1995 births
Living people
South African female field hockey players
Field hockey players at the 2020 Summer Olympics
Olympic field hockey players of South Africa
Stellenbosch University alumni
20th-century South African women
21st-century South African women
Field hockey players from Cape Town
Field hockey players at the 2022 Commonwealth Games